Mayiwane is an inkhundla of Eswatini, located in the Hhohho District. Its population at the 2007 census was 15,120.

References
"Constituencies of Swaziland", Statoids. Retrieved December 11, 2010

Populated places in Hhohho Region